Sargento mayor ("sergeant major") was a rank immediately below that of maestre de campo in the Spanish tercios of the 16th and 17th centuries.  Initially second in rank to a coronel ("colonel") in a colunella, the sargento mayor became second in rank to the maestre de campo after the creation of the tercios in 1534. He took care of the tactical training, security and lodging of the troops of the tercio. He also transmitted the orders of the maestre de campo or the capitán general to subordinate officers.

16th and 17th centuries 
Initially second in command below Colonel in a coronelía, the Sargento Mayor later came to occupy the position immediately below the Maestre de Campo after the creation of the tercios in 1534 and until 1600. The rank was in charge of teaching tactics, security and lodging of tercio troops. Would also delegate orders from the Maestre de Campo or the Capitán General to lower level officers.

Nineteenth century 
In Argentina, since the 1813 law in which ranks where divided into three groups, Oficiales generales, oficiales jefes y oficiales (general officers, lead officers, and officers), the rank of Sargento Mayor was part Oficiales jefes (lead officers), intermediately above Capitán (and officer) and intermediately below Teniente Coronel (Lieutenant Colonel), with the latter below Coronel (Colonel), from where a promotion lead to the Oficiales Generales (General officers).<ref>Historia de los Grados Militares. Sergio Toyos. SoldadosDigital.com  p. 5. Archived 24 September 2015. [https://web.archive.org/web/20150924103618/http://www.soldadosdigital.com/2010/pdf/grados-militares.pdf Archived on 24 September 2015.]</ref>

 Today 

In Colombia, Sargento Mayor is the top rank within the sub-officers of Colombia Armed Forces as well as the National Police; the rank is intermediately above Sargento Primero (First Sergeant). In the executive level of the Colombia National Police, it is equivalent to the rank of Comisario.DECRETO 1791 DE 2000 (septiembre 14) In Colombia's Military Forces there are three levels of Sargento Mayor''.

See also
 Teniente a guerra
 Santa Hermandad
 Corregidor
 Alcalde
 Alcalde ordinario
 Corregidor
 Cabildo (council)
 Regidor
 Síndico
 Ayuntamiento
 Corregimiento
 Alcalde de la Santa Hermandad

References

External links
 Guardia Civil Española (c. 1898) (Includes military ranks in 1880s Spanish Empire.)

Military ranks
Military history of Spain
Spanish colonial governors and administrators
Early Modern history of Spain
14th-century establishments in Spain
1800s disestablishments
Positions of subnational authority

es:Sargento Mayor